The 1961–62 Washington State Cougars men's basketball team represented Washington State University for the 1961–62 NCAA college basketball season. Led by fourth-year head coach Marv Harshman, the Cougars were an independent and played their home games on campus at Bohler Gymnasium in Pullman, Washington.

The Cougars were  overall in the regular season, and dropped both games to rival 

Washington State was 4–12 against the former Northern Division of the Pacific Coast Conference: Washington (0–2), Oregon (2–2), Oregon State (0–5), and Palouse neighbor

References

External links
Sports Reference – Washington State Cougars: 1961–62 basketball season

Washington State Cougars men's basketball seasons
Washington State
Washington State
Washington State